The Swimming competition of the 25th Summer Universiade was held at the Tašmajdan Sports Centre in Belgrade, Serbia, 5–11 July 2009. All events were contested in a long course (50m) pool.

Of note, this was held just 2 weeks prior to the 2009 World Championships.

Participating nations
Teams from 62 countries participated in Swimming at the 2009 World University Games. They were from:

Results

Men's events

Women's events

Medal table

See also
2009 in swimming

References

2009 Summer Universiade
Universiade
Swimming at the Summer Universiade